James McMillan Simpson (29 October 1908 – 15 March 1972) was a Scottish footballer who played as a centre half. He spent most of his club career with Rangers, winning ten major honours, and made 14 appearances for the Scotland national team.

Career
After playing junior football for Newburgh West End, Jimmy Simpson signed for Dundee United in 1925 and made his debut at the age of 17 as a wing half. A regular during the club's first two years at the top level, United could not retain him following relegation in 1927 and he was transferred to Rangers for the then sizable fee of £1,000.

At Ibrox he was initially a reserve, but was converted into a centre half and became an integral part of the team which dominated the Scottish game during the 1930s. Simpson won six League championships and four Scottish Cups, adding four Scottish League XI caps and 14 full international caps to his collection. He also qualified as an engineer, which became his vocation after he had finished playing.

Simpson left Rangers in 1941, making wartime appearances for Dundee United, and would also play in unofficial competitions for St Mirren before retiring from playing. In 1946 he took up a player–coach role with Highland League club Buckie Thistle. He was appointed manager of Alloa Athletic on 19 December 1947, but left the club by mutual agreement on 19 February 1949.

Personal life
His son Ronnie, a goalkeeper, also played for Scotland and was part of the Celtic side which won the 1967 European Cup Final.

Honours
Rangers
Scottish League (6): 1930–31, 1932–33, 1933–34, 1934–35, 1936–37, 1938–39
Scottish Cup (4): 1931–32, 1933–34, 1934–35, 1935–36
Glasgow Cup (6): 1931–32, 1932–33, 1933–34, 1935–36, 1936–37, 1937–38

See also	
List of Scotland national football team captains
 List of Scottish football families

References

External links

1908 births
1972 deaths
Footballers from Fife
Association football central defenders
Scottish footballers
Scotland international footballers
Dundee United F.C. players
Dundee United F.C. wartime guest players
St Mirren F.C. wartime guest players
Rangers F.C. players
Buckie Thistle F.C. players
Scottish Football League players
Scottish Football League representative players
Scottish football managers
Alloa Athletic F.C. managers
Scottish Football League managers
Highland Football League players
Place of death missing
Newburgh F.C. players
Scottish Junior Football Association players